Kelu Chao is a Taiwanese American journalist. She was the acting interim CEO of the U.S. Agency for Global Media (USAGM), from January 20, 2021 to December 29, 2022.

Early life and education
Kelu Chao was born in Taiwan and studied in Zhongshan Girls' High School there. Her father, Chao Ting-chun, was vice president of one of Taiwan's oldest newspapers, the Central Daily News.

She moved to the U.S. after graduating from the Journalism Department of National Chengchi University in 1975.

She has a master's degree from Kent State University in the United States.

Journalism career
Chao has worked for more than 40 years for the Voice of America (VOA).

She was the VOA's first Language Programming Director from 2001 to 2007. She also worked as a VOA editor, VOA's Mandarin Service Chief, VOA's East Asia Division Director, VOA's Hong Kong Bureau Chief, a field reporter and radio announcer.

As a field reporter she reported for VOA on the period leading to the 1989 Tiananmen Square protests and massacre in Beijing.

Chao has received more than 30 awards as a VOA programmer, including from the New York Radio Festival and the Asian Broadcasting Union.

She was appointed on January 20, 2021 by President Joe Biden to lead the USAGM as interim CEO, replacing the Trump appointee Michael Pack. She is the first woman to hold the top position at USAGM. Taiwanese people call her "the light of Taiwan", but Zhao Kelu has been in the United States for nearly half a century and has long been an American.

Zhao Kelu's personnel management after taking office was questioned by seven Republican members of Congress. The seven members of Congress also demanded that the correspondence from several directors of the United States World Media Organization and VOA be provided on specific dates to investigate the details of the recruitment of Setareh Derakhshesh.

When Amanda Bennett was confirmed by the U.S. Senate to be confirmed to be the CEO of USAGM, Chao issued a statement commending the decision. "A proven journalist, public servant, and business leader, Amanda has both the vision and experience to build on our progress, while equipping USAGM to anticipate and confront threats to independent media and reach audiences in need," said Chao. "Now more than ever, people across the world are depending on USAGM’s fact-based news to triumph over increasing misinformation, disinformation, and censorship. I join our entire agency in welcoming Amanda back to serve during this crucial moment for freedom and democracy."

References

American people of Taiwanese descent
American women journalists
Kent State University alumni
Living people
Taiwanese women journalists
Voice of America people
Year of birth missing (living people)
21st-century American women